Mongkol (meaning auspicious, from ) may refer to:

Mongkol (name)
Mongkol Borei District, a district of Banteay Meanchey Province in north eastern Cambodia
Mongkol Borei River, a river that flows through the district to the Tonle Sap 
Mongkol Borei (town), the capital of Mongkol Borei District
Robas Mongkol, a commune in north-western Cambodia

See also
Mangala (disambiguation)
Mongkhon, different romanization of the same Thai term, referring to a talismanic headgear used in Muay Thai